"Eat You Up" is a song by British singer-songwriter Angie Gold, written by Gold and Anthony Baker and released in 1985 by Passion Records. It was written by Gold and Anthony Baker, and produced by Les Hunt.

The single peaked at No. 30 on Billboards Dance Club Songs. It found more success in Japan, where it was titled  and spent four consecutive weeks at No. 1 on Oricon's international singles chart in early 1986. The song was also adapted in several languages by other artists in Japan, Hong Kong, and South Korea.

Gold later re-recorded the song with producer Ian Levine for her 1995 compilation album The Best of Angie Gold: Eat You Up.

Track listing

Charts

Cover versions 
 Yōko Oginome covered the song in Japanese as her seventh single "Dancing Hero (Eat You Up)", from her 1985 compilation The Best. This version peaked at No. 5 on Oricon's singles chart and has since become her most popular song.
 Yumi Yano covered the song in Japanese in her 1985 EP Makin' It. The lyrics are completely different from Oginome's version.
 Priscila Chan covered the song in Cantonese as "Tiu3 Mou5 Gaai1" (lit. "Dancing Street") in 1986, based mainly on Oginome's version. The song topped the Hong Kong charts and was awarded the 1986 Jade Solid Gold Best Ten Award for Most Popular Disco Song. "Tiu3 Mou5 Gaai1" is regarded as one of the pinnacles of Chan's career.
 Lee Eun-ha covered the song in Korean as "Salanghaeyo" (lit. "I Love You") in 1986.
 In the 1990s, Sandeep Sapkota's Nepali version, "Dance Tonight", received constant replay on Nepal's national television. The song, also modeled on Oginome's version in the musical structure, was released on Sapkota's album Ayaam.
  (born 1970) covered the song in Korean as "Hwalyeohan Single" (lit. "Gorgeous Single Man") in 2003.
 Demon Kakka covered the song in his 2007 cover album Girls Rock Hakurai. His cover incorporates the lyrics of Oginome's version.

References

External links 
 
 

1985 songs
1985 singles
Oricon International Singles Chart number-one singles
Song recordings produced by Ian Levine